Thomas Bonney may refer to:

 Thomas George Bonney (1833–1923), English geologist
 Thomas Bonney (priest) (1782–1863), Archdeacon of Leicester